The Jin'an Bridge is a suspension bridge near Lijiang, Yunnan, China. At , it is the fourth highest bridge in the world. The bridge forms part of the G4216 Chengdu–Lijiang Expressway carrying traffic over the Jinsha River. The bridge construction began in 2016, the structure closed in January 2020 and it opened for traffic on 31 December 2020.

The bridge crosses the river 1.4 km upstream from the Jin'anqiao Dam. Due to the formation of the reservoir behind the dam, the full clearance to the original river level will not be visible.

Original design
The original design of the expressway crossed the Jinsha River  20 km downstream at the village of Taku. The Taku Bridge was also a suspension bridge design.

See also
List of bridges in China
Bridges and tunnels across the Yangtze River
List of highest bridges in the world
List of longest suspension bridge spans

References

External links

Jinshajiang Bridge Jin'an on HighestBridges.com
Jinshajiang Bridge Taku on HighestBridges.com

Bridges in Yunnan
Transport in Lijiang
Suspension bridges in China